Hary Susanto (born 25 January 1975) is an Indonesian para-badminton player who has played each of the three variations of the sport (men's singles, men's doubles, and mixed doubles) at the highest world level. He has won a gold medal at the Summer Paralympics, four medals at the BWF Para-Badminton World Championships, five medals at the Asian Para Games and nine medals at the ASEAN Para Games.

In 2021, Susanto represented Indonesia in the men's singles and mixed doubles event of the 2020 Summer Paralympics, winning the gold medal in the latter.

Awards and nominations

Achievements

Paralympic Games 
Mixed doubles

World Championships 
Men's doubles

Mixed doubles

Asian Para Games 
Men's singles

Men's doubles

Mixed doubles

Asian Championships 
Men's singles

Men's doubles

ASEAN Para Games 
Men's singles

Men's doubles

Mixed doubles

BWF Para Badminton World Circuit (1 runner-up) 

The BWF Para Badminton World Circuit – Grade 2, Level 1, 2 and 3 tournaments has been sanctioned by the  Badminton World Federation from 2022. 

Men's doubles

International tournaments (14 titles, 3 runners-up) 
Men's singles

Men's doubles

Mixed doubles

References

1975 births
Living people
People from Majalengka Regency
Indonesian male badminton players
Indonesian para-badminton players
Paralympic badminton players of Indonesia
Badminton players at the 2020 Summer Paralympics
Paralympic medalists in badminton
Medalists at the 2020 Summer Paralympics
Paralympic gold medalists for Indonesia

External links
 Hary Susanto at BWFpara.tournamentsoftware.com